North Macedonia is divided into eight statistical regions.

Regions

See also

List of regions of North Macedonia by Human Development Index
Municipalities of North Macedonia

References